Laarbeek is a municipality located in the province of North Brabant in the south of the Netherlands. It was formed in 1997 from the former municipalities Beek en Donk, Aarle-Rixtel and Lieshout (which included the village Mariahout). Laarbeek is part of the city region 'Samenwerkingsverband Regio Eindhoven', centered on the city of Eindhoven. The town hall is located in Beek en Donk.

Lieshout is home of the Bavaria Brewery, one of the Netherlands' largest breweries which produces for local and foreign markets.

The Croy Castle is located near the village Aarle-Rixtel.

Population centres

Politics

Municipal government
As of the 2018 municipal election, The municipal council of Laarbeek has five parties. The municipal executive consists of four coalition parties: De Werkgroep, Algemeen Belang Laarbeek (ABL), Christian Democratic Appeal (CDA) and Labour (PvdA). Each of these parties has one Alderman in the College van Burgemeester en Wethouders

!style="background-color:#E9E9E9" align=center colspan=2|Party
!style="background-color:#E9E9E9" align=right|Seats
|-
|bgcolor="#ce0c69" width=2|
|align=left|Partij Nieuw Laarbeek||
|-
|bgcolor="#e35a0c" width=2|
|align=left|De Werkgroep||
|-
|bgcolor="#3FA9F5" width=2|
|align=left|Algemeen Belang Laarbeek||
|-
|bgcolor="#015CAB" width=2|
|align=left|Ouderen Appèl - Hart voor Laarbeek||
|-
| 
|align=left|Christian Democratic Appeal||
|-
| 
|align=left|Labour Party||
|}

Topography

Dutch Topographic map of the municipality of Laarbeek, June 2015.

Notable people 

 Arnoldus Arlenius (ca.1510 – 1582) a Dutch humanist philosopher and poet
 Eustáquio van Lieshout (1890 in Aarle-Rixtel – 1943) a Dutch RC missionary in Brazil
 Guus Meeuwis (born 1972 in Mariahout) a Dutch singer-songwriter
 Bram Zwanen (born 1998 in Aarle-Rixtel) a Dutch footballer

Gallery

References

External links 

 

 
Municipalities of North Brabant
Municipalities of the Netherlands established in 1997